Eleventh grade, 11th grade, junior year, or grade 11 (called Year 12 in Wales and England and fifth form in Jamaica) is the eleventh, and for some countries final, grade of secondary schools. Students are typically 16–17 years of age, depending on the country and the students' birthdays.

Australia
In Australia, Year 11 is the twelfth year of education and fifth year of high school education. Although there are slight variations between the states, most students in Year 11 are aged around fifteen, sixteen or seventeen. In Queensland, Year 11 students are the youngest in the country, as they usually enter at age fifteen.

In New South Wales, Year 11 is the shortest year as it only lasts three whole terms. Year 12 begins its first term where Year 11 would have its fourth.

Year 11 is followed by Year 12, the final year of high school.

Bangladesh
In Bangladesh, students get admitted in the 11th grade after passing the Secondary School Certificate (SSC) examinations. Educational institutions offering the 11th–12th grade education are known as colleges. To study in the 11th grade, students must choose one of the three streams, i.e., science, humanities, and business studies.

Belgium
In Belgium, the 11th grade is called "5e secondaire" in the French speaking part of the country, "5de middelbaar" in the Dutch speaking part and "5te sekundäre" in the German speaking part of Belgium.

Brazil 
In Brazil, the eleventh grade is the "segundo ano do ensino médio", meaning "second grade of high school". Students tend to be 16 years old.

Bulgaria
In Bulgaria, the 11th grade is the penultimate year of the high-school (gymnasium) stage. Students tend to be 17–18 years old.

Canada
In all provinces and territories, except Quebec, a student continues to Grade 12 to complete their high school, or secondary, education. In Quebec, Grade 11 (sec. 5) is the final year of secondary education, followed by CEGEP (college), a pre-university level unique to Quebec.

Colombia
In this year, all students are required to do an internship in any subject field. To differentiate from universities' internships, the practice is called 'alphabetisation'; most of the time is related to community services, such as teaching in schools, or assisting in hospitals or libraries. Students also do the ICFES National Test and they present to the draft for the Colombian Army. By law, the army cannot recruit under-age students; most of eleventh-graders are aged 16–17, and the draft is almost changed for the payment of a monetary fee.

Finland
In Finland there are three years of high school. 11th grade is the second.

France
The equivalent is the Première, which is the penultimate year of Secondary education in France (followed by the Terminale).

Greece
In Greece, the eleventh (11th) grade is called second year of lyceum school or high school or upper secondary school (Deutera Lykeiou – Δευτέρα Λυκείου), it is not compulsory to attend, and is the penultimate year of secondary education.

Hong Kong
In Hong Kong, 11th grade is called Form 5.

India
In India, the Eleventh Grade is the first year of higher secondary education and this grade is mainly the third year of High School (i.e Higher/Senior Secondary School or Senior High School) according to all National and State Boards of India and according to some State Boards of India it the first year of Junior College (i.e Intermediate or Pre-University College). Generally the equivalent grade for this grade is known as "Class 11" or "Plus 1". Generally Eleventh Grade is known as "+1" which originates from the term "10+1". It is also Called as "Intermediate 1st Year"(Intermediate Course), "HSC"(Higher Secondary Certificate), "FJYC"(First Year Junior College), "1st PUC"(1st Year Pre-University Course) in different regions and states. Also, in this year the students opt for one stream out of three streams namely Science, Commerce and Arts/Humanities which they want to study further in future at various Universities across the globe.

The three streams consists of various combinations of subjects:
 Science, which comprises Physics, Chemistry, Biology/Mathematics, English, Computer Science/Information Technology/Electronics/Physical Education/Psychology/Home Science/Food Nutrition and Dietetics/Web Applications
 Commerce, which comprises Accountancy/Financing, Marketing/Retailing, English, Business Studies/Business Administration, Economics, Information Technology /Applied Mathematics/Physical Education, 
 Humanities/Arts which comprises English, Basic Mathematics, History, Political Science, Geography/Economics, Mass Media/Music/Food Nutrition and Dietetics, Psychology/Fashion Studies/Physical Education and Computer Science/Information Technology.
NOTE - Some institutions offer languages also as their main subject or as a vocational subject. The combination of streams can vary from Institutions.

But abroad, the streams are determined by the model exam, which is under the school. The stream which the students opt for are the basis of which degree they can study. The Grade 11 is generally the continuation of Grade 9 and Grade 12 is the continuation of Grade 10. In this year a student can also change his stream in the middle of the academic year from Science to other streams, but the reverse is not possible. In Grade 11, students prepare for the various national and state entrance exams of various colleges and universities across the country.

Indonesia
In Indonesia, after appearing for Class X Boards, the students opt for the programs they want to study.

There are three programs:
 Science, which comprises Physics, Chemistry and Biology
 Social, which comprises Economy, Geography and Sociology
 Language, which comprises Foreign Languages, Indonesian Literature and Anthropology

Ireland
It is Fifth Year or Cúigú Bhliain of Secondary School (for 15- to 17-year-olds as there is an optional year beforehand). In this year, students prepare for the Leaving Certificate.

Nepal
In Nepal, students complete their SEE boards. Afterwards, they start their 11th as starting of "college level education".

11 is not considered as school but college 
Students can take in 3 different streams in plus 2 ( 11, 12)

Science
Arts
Management

Mathematics, Social Studies, Nepali and English are compulsory subjects in all streams.

There is provision of A level education and IB too

Israel
In Israel, eleventh grade is known as "Yud-Aleph" (11 in Hebrew numerals, י"א). Ages of the students average at around 16-17.
Eleventh grade is when Israeli students do their final tests for most  of the subjects for their high school diploma ("te'udat bagrut", roughly translates to 'diploma of maturity')

Many students consider it to be the hardest and most stressful year, because in most schools, they do the final test for every subject besides English, Maths, and their Megamot (1-2 classes the student chooses, it's mandatory to choose at least 1).

Malaysia
In Malaysia, 11th grade also known as Form 5 in secondary school. The students at this stage are 17 years old, and it is the fifth and last year in the secondary school. (Compare to Form 6 or known as 12th grade).

Mexico
In some parts the eleventh grade is the second year of high school. Most students enter this grade as 16 year olds, but some might enter early as 15 and late as 17.

Norway
In Norway, the eleventh year of education is the first year of Videregående skole, equivalent to high school. It is not referred to as the eleventh grade, but rather the first grade of Videregående or VG1. Although Videregående skole is not compulsory for Norwegians, approximately 93% of people aged 16–18 enroll. There is no upper age limit for starting or finishing Videregående skole, but students cannot enroll earlier than the year they turn 16.

New Zealand
In New Zealand, Year 12 is the equivalent of eleventh grade, with students aged 16 or 17 during the years. It is the fourth year of secondary school and the twelfth year of compulsory education. During Year 12, most students complete Level 2 of the National Certificate of Educational Achievement (NCEA), the country's main national qualification for secondary school students. Students in Year 12 typically study English (or Te Reo Māori) and a minimum of five elective subjects with mathematics highly recommended.

Pakistan
Grade eleven is the first of the two years in college (grade twelve being the last and final year before university education) and is equivalently referred to as "first year." Students in this year level are fifteen to sixteen years old. Students get to select from the following subjects:

Pre-medical (Biology, Physics, Chemistry)

Pre-engineering (Math, Physics, Chemistry)

Commerce

Humanities

Science

Home economics

Arts

And the compulsory subjects are Urdu, Islamic studies (1st year only) and Pakistan studies (2nd year only). The students can select the preferred subject on the basis of SSC result (9th and 10th grade)

Philippines
In the Philippines, Grade 11 is the first year of Senior High School and the fifth year of High School curriculum. Topics discussed depend on the four tracks and their strands.

 Academic Track
ABM (Accountancy, Business & Management)
STEM (Science, Technology, Engineering & Mathematics)
HUMSS (Humanities & Social Sciences)
GAS (General Academic Strand)
Pre-Baccalaureate Maritime
 Technical-Vocational Track
Agri-Fishery Arts
Home Economics
Industrial Arts
Information Communications Technology (ICT)
TVL Maritime
 Sports Track
 Arts and Design Track

Since school year 2016–2017. Students are usually 16–17 years old.

Russia
The eleventh grade is final year of secondary education, the end of the high school, and it is an examinational year, when training to USE is being more powerful, than in tenth grade. Priority of education in this year is given to repeat the material learned in high school (Fifth to Tenth years) in Mathematics, Russian language and in exam subjects by pupils' choice.

Singapore
In Singapore, 11th grade is equivalent of Secondary 5 level.

Only people taking N Levels (normal academic levels) will go to secondary 5, those in express streams will take their O levels (ordinary levels) in secondary 4, and then continue to a Junior College for 2 years or Polytechnic for 3 years.

Spain
The closest equivalent to the eleventh grade is the first year of Bachillerato. It is for pupils aged 16 to 17. It is a year of many changes when pupils can start to choose what they would like to study in the future at university.
There are three types of “Bachilleratos”:

Main subjects:
Spanish, English, Physical education and philosophy.

Science: math, physics and chemistry and biology and geology (health-orientated degrees) or technical drawing.

Humanities/Sociology: Latin and Greek or math oriented for sociology and economy, history and literature.

Arts: music, drama class, design, history of art.

Sweden
This is the first year of Upper Secondary School.

United Kingdom

England and Wales

Year 12, or Lower Sixth form, is comparable to the 11th grade in the US. It is the sixth and penultimate year of secondary education.  During Year 12, students usually take the first half of three or four A-Level or equivalent subjects. Some students take Advanced Subsidiary Level (AS-Level) exams at the end of Year 12.

Students then enter Year 13 (equivalent to 12th grade) and may be able to drop a subject. Successful completion generally results in the award of A-Level qualifications, though BTECs can be received.

Scotland
In Scotland, fifth year (of secondary education) or S5 is optional, where pupils will generally sit Higher qualifications which form the core entry requirements for university. It is followed by an optional final sixth year (also known as S6). The students ages normally range from 16 to 17 in this year.

Northern Ireland
The system is similar to the English one at this age. Lower Sixth Form (Year 13), pupils start on a two-year course, at the end of which they will hopefully have gained three 'A' Levels in their chosen subjects.

United States

In the US, a student in the eleventh grade is typically referred to as a junior. The vast majority of students who are classified as juniors take the SAT Reasoning Test and/or ACT in the second semester of their third year of high school.

Math students usually take algebra II, but classes like trigonometry or precalculus are sometimes offered for students who wish to take Advanced Placement math classes in their fourth, or senior year of high school. Depending on the location there may be a combination of any of the listed subjects. They may also take easier courses such as algebra I and geometry if they do not have the required prerequisites for the more advanced courses that are listed above. Students who are advanced in mathematics often take calculus or statistics.

In science classes, third year students are taught, usually biology, physics or chemistry, especially lab chemistry.

In English class, a college-preparatory curriculum would also include American literature. Often, English literature is taught in the third year of high school. Books and authors learned include The Glass Menagerie, The Scarlet Letter, The Crucible, The Great Gatsby, Of Mice and Men, The Adventures of Huckleberry Finn, The Grapes of Wrath, Jonathan Edwards, Amy Tan, and Lorraine Hansberry.

In a social studies curriculum, third year students in the United States are usually taught US history or the world from the 1870s to the 21st Century. These courses could be also taught in ninth or tenth grade as well. They may also acquire more advanced world culture and geography knowledge, along with some more-advanced social studies such as psychology, economics, sociology and government.

Many high school third year students in the United States opt to take a foreign language, even though it is not required in many secondary schools curricula.

While normally followed by twelfth grade, some colleges will accept excelling students out of this grade as part of an early college entrance program. Alternatively, some students may choose to graduate early through standardized testing or advanced credits.

Lebanon
Eleventh grade is also known as grade 11 or premiere. Students are divided into either scientific which then proceeds to become life science (LS or SV) or general science (GS or SG) in grade 12 and economics (ES or SE) which proceeds to become Economics (ES or SE) or Humanities (H) in grade 12. The choice of division is done according to grades and sometimes according to what the student wants to do in college. A student can go from scientific to economics later in grade 12, but not the opposite.

See also
 Educational stage
 Ninth grade
 Tenth grade
 Twelfth grade
 Senior secondary education

References

11
Secondary education